In mid-August 2011, Zimbabwe's Chef de Mission for the 2011 All-Africa Games, Custom Kachambwa, announced that the country would send 170 athletes in 17 disciplines to the 10th All-Africa Games in Maputo, Mozambique, September 3–18, 2011.

Zimbabwean athletes are to participate in: athletics, badminton, basketball, boxing, chess, cycling, judo, karate, netball, sailing, swimming, table tennis, taekwondo, tennis, and triathlon. The team announcement also included 12 athletes in disabled event categories.

Medalists

 Kirsty Coventry: gold in 100m backstroke, 200m backstroke, 100m Individual Medley; silver in chess
 Takanyi Garanganga: gold in 200m Individual Medley
Takanyi Garanganga & Mark Fynn: bronze in doubletennis
 Robert Gwaze: gold in singles tennis
 Nicole Horn: silver in 100m butterfly, 100m freestyle
 Nyaradzai Tagarira: silver in 200m freestyle
Samantha Welch: bronze in 100m breastroke

 Kirsten Lapham, Samantha Welch, Kirsty Coventry, Nicole Horn: silver in 100m (T13) 

 Kirsten Lapham, Samantha Welch, Kirsty Coventry, Nicole Horn: silver in 4 × 400 m IM
 Kirsten Lapham, Samantha Welch, Kirsty Coventry, Nicole Horn: silver in 4 × 100 m freestyle
 Kirsten Lapham, Samantha Welch, Kirsty Coventry, Nicole Horn: silver in 4 × 200 m freestyle

Results

Athletics
Men - Ngoni Makusha, Gabriel Mvumvure, Kelvin Pangiso, Brian Dzingai, Francis Zimwara, Nelton Ndebele, Connias Mudzingwa, Tinashe Mutanga, David, Tinago, Abdul Simbili, D. Bhebhe, Lewis Masunda
Women - Letiwe Mharakurwa, Namatirai Mavugara, Grace Gimo, Faith Goremusandu, Thandi Nyathi, Irene Ndoreka

Badminton
Ngoni Mhinda, Paul Kapolo, Rishi Verma

Basketball
Women's team - Rachel Makoni, Margret Magwaro, Fadzai Mabasa, Charity Chigumba, Isobel Tengende, Dorcas Marondera, Sharon Chamwarura, Ethel Shaba, Sibongile Mkandla, Alex Maseko, Nobunkosi Ndlovu, Geraldine Chibonda

Boxing
Josphat Mufayi, Foster Masiyambumbi, Steven Masiyambumbi

Chess
Robert Gwaze, Rodwell Makoto, Dion Moyo, Leeroy Paratambwa, Spencer Masango

Cycling
Brighton Chipongo, David Martin, Conway Mohamed, Nkulumo Dube, Alfred Tigere

Women's football 
Onai Chingawo, Chido Dzingirai, Manyara Mandara, Rudo Neshamba, Ruvimbo Mutyavaviri, Eunice Chibanda, Nobuhle Magika, Ntombizodwa Sibanda, Rufaro Machingura, Danai Bhobho, Patience Mujuru, Talent Mandaza, Marjory Nyaumwe, Tsitsi Mairosi, Nokuthula Ndlovu, Violet Bepete, Emmaculate Msipa, Erina Jeke, Kudakwashe Basopo, Ntombiyelanga Ndlovu

Judo
Bruce Sibanda, Sydney Chibwayi, Simbarashe Mashayi

Karate
Gondo Gondo, Victor Bhunu, David Dube, Winston Nyanhete, Justin Mashiri, Simba Chihlava, Kuda Chihlava

Netball
Sukokuhle Nkomo, Tarisai Sesa, Daphine Agere, Paida Pedzisayi, Rudo Karume, Caroline Matura, Pauline Jani, Perpetua Siyachitema, Edzai Nkosana, Patience Chinhoyi, Netsai Muchemwa,

Sailing
Kegan Stubs, Laphan Dennis, Ryan Kluckow, Pavlo Hiripis, Patrick MacCosh, Androniki Hiripisi, Andrew Faber, Cameron MacCosh

Swimming
Kirsty Coventry, Nicole Horn, Kirsten Lapham, Samatha Welch, Grant Behan, Tim Ferris, James Lawson, Nicholas Burnett

Table Tennis
Tinashe Chikaka, Brian Chamboko, Cythia Marisamhuka, Fungai Mashingaidze, Takudzwa Mudonhi, John Muringani (President)

Taekwondo
Mike Sidija, Knowledge Machakati, Langton Chokwenda, Marylin Mangoto

Tennis
Mbonisi Ndimande, Takanyi Garanganga, Valeria Bhunu, Pauline Chawafambira

Triathlon
Chris Felgate, Brendon Mitchell, Cory O'Riorden, Laurelle Brown, Pamela Fulton Sports for People with

Disabilities
Laina Sithole, Tagarira Nyaradzai, Rodah Bulabula, Brave Pugeni, Peter Chideme, Polite Maradzika, Desire Chivanga, Elliot Mujaji, Clement Nyoni, Kuda Hove, Elford Moyo, Maggie Bangajena

References
 Team Zimbabwe Media at All-Africa Games, Maputo 2011
Goodwill Zunidza (Zimbabwe Newspapers Group)
Spencer Banda (Zim Broadcasting Corporation)

Nations at the 2011 All-Africa Games
2011
All-Africa Games